Li Jianbo (born February 1959) is a Chinese politician. At the height of his career, he served as a member of the Central Commission for Discipline Inspection (CCDI), the party's highest internal-control institution. He was removed from membership of the CCDI in January 2017.

He was a member of the 18th Central Commission for Discipline Inspection.

Biography
Li was born in Gongyi, Henan in February 1959. After university, he successively worked in Luoyang Municipal Commission for Discipline Inspection, Henan Provincial Party Committee office, Research Office of the Central Commission for Discipline Inspection, Linyi Municipal Committee, and the General Office of the Chinese Communist Party.

Beginning in November 1995, he served in several posts in the General Office of the Chinese Communist Party, including associate director of politics Division of Research and Investigation Section, director of Science Education Division, and director of Legal Affairs Office.

In September 2003 he was promoted to become director of Confidential communications Bureau, a position he held for almost ten years until he was appointed Leader of the Discipline Inspection Team sent by Central Commission for Discipline Inspection to Ministry of Transport.

In January 2017, the CCDI gave him a serious warning as a measure of party discipline, and he was removed from membership of the CCDI.

References

1959 births
Living people
People's Republic of China politicians from Henan
Chinese Communist Party politicians from Henan